Johnson Peak is the highest mountain, in Tuolumne Meadows, Yosemite National Park.

Johnson Peak is made of eroded granite. At 85 Ma, the Johnson Granite Porphyry is the youngest granite rock in the Yosemite National Park, though the entire peak formed beneath the Earth's crust. It broached the surface much later, via subduction.

Despite it being a fairly easy hike, Johnson Peak climbed less frequently than its many neighbors. Yet from summit, there are lovely views of those same stunning mountains, particularly Unicorn Peak, Cockscomb Peak, Echo Peaks and Matthes Crest. To the north and east, you can also see Mount Conness, Mount Dana and Mammoth Peak, and to the southeast you can see Mount Maclure and Mount Lyell.

The name, and the mountain range

R.B. Marshall named Johnson Peak, in the 1890s, to honor a teamster and guide in his survey party, with Professor Davidson. They also climbed Mount Conness.

Johnson Peak is part of the Cathedral Range.

Geology, and the area

Johnson granite porphyry, whose name derives from Johnson Peak, is found there. Far above what is now Johnson Peak, it is possible that a volcanic caldera once may have existed.

Johnson Peak is quite near Elizabeth Lake.

See also

 Cathedral Lakes, which are directly below Cathedral Peak
 Cathedral Peak
 Elizabeth Lake
 Mount Dana, the second highest mountain in Yosemite
 Mount Lyell, the highest mountain in Yosemite National Park

References

External links

 Johnson Peak Loop
 Summit Post on climbing Johnson Peak
 Topoquest on Johnson Peak

Mountains of Yosemite National Park
Mountains of Tuolumne County, California